At the 2005 National Games of China, the athletics events were held at the Nanjing Olympic Sports Center in Nanjing, Jiangsu Province, PR China from 17 to 22 October 2005. A total of 46 events were contested, 24 by male and 22 by female athletes. The National Games marathon race was held before the main competition, as it was incorporated into that year's Beijing Marathon on 16 October.

Twenty-eight teams (representing regions or other bodies) reached the medal table, as did a number of individual athletes. Shandong topped the medal and points table with nine gold medals and twenty in total, while runner-up Jiangsu matched that haul but won seven golds. Shanxi took third in the medal table with five gold medals, although Guangdong and Liaoning placed third and fourth in the more comprehensive points table system.

The event was seen as a key step towards preparing China's athletes for the 2008 Summer Olympics. Xing Huina completed a double in the women's 5000 metres and 10,000 metres and would have had a third in the 1500 metres but she was disqualified for elbowing Liu Qing (who herself completed a double having won the 800 metres). The top two from the women's marathon – Sun Yingjie and Zhou Chunxiu – flew in from Beijing the day before the 10,000 m but still managed second and third place, respectively. The result did not stand, however, as Sun failed a drugs test for androsterone. Her test at the Beijing Marathon the previous day was negative but, in spite of a civil court ruling a rival athlete had spiked her drink, she was disqualified and banned for two years.

Liu Xiang, the 2004 Olympic champion in the 110 metres hurdles, was one of the biggest draws of the games and he beat Shi Dongpeng, winning the gold in a world-class time. Huang Xiaoxiao won golds in both the 400 metres dash and 400 metres hurdles, although hurdles silver medallist Wang Xing received as much as attention as she knocked three tenths of a second off the world junior record. Qin Wangping took a women's 100 metres/200 metres sprint double, beating Liu Li on both occasions. Two men broke senior records en route to victory: Meng Yan set Chinese record in the men's 400 m hurdles while Yu Chaohong set an Asian record in the men's 50 km race walk.

Records

Medal summary

Men

Women

Medal table

 † = Athletes competing without a team

References

Results
Medallists of athletics tournament at National Games. ChinaView (2005-10-22). Retrieved on 2010-08-14.
10th National Games, Nanjing Olympic Center Stadium. Tilas Topaja (2005-11-14). Retrieved on 2010-08-15.

External links
Games site at Xinhua

2005 National Games of China
2005
National Games of the People's Republic of China